Cristóbal (Carlos Domingo Romualdo y Ricardo) Oudrid y Segura (7 February 1825 – 13 March 1877) was a Spanish pianist, conductor, and composer. He is noted for his many contributions to the formation and development of the zarzuela genre in Spain during the second half of the 19th century. He was a gifted musician—but with little technical knowledge, which he bragged about to receive more credit from others with relation to his creations. This habit earned him the scathing criticism of people like Antonio Peña y Goñi who, nevertheless, praised the bright, sensual and cheerful ease with which Oudrid used to bring to life the true meaning of the Spanish song.

During a successful career of more than 25 years, Oudrid produced over a hundred works, many in association with other composers. His first musical presentation was the Andalusian zarzuela La Venta del Puerto o Juanillo El Contrabandista, premiered at Teatro del Príncipe in 1846. His second venture was La Pradera del Canal, a collaborative work with composers Luis de Cepeda Baranda and Sebastián Iradier, premiered at Teatro de la Cruz in 1847. As a founding father of Spanish musical nationalism, he was instrumental in bringing the zarzuela to a national status, in the company of other prominent artists such as Francisco Asenjo Barbieri, Joaquín Gaztambide, Rafael Hernando, José Inzenga, and baritone Francisco Salas, with whom he formed the Sociedad Artística Musical in 1851.

Oudrid was particularly prolific also as a bandmaster during the 1850s and early 1860s, having conducted the orchestra at Teatro Real, where renowned tenors such as Roberto Stagno (1840–1897) and Enrico Tamberlik (1820–1889) premiered, as well as the orchestra of Teatro de la Zarzuela. His last performance was the rehearsal of the opera Mignon by the French composer Ambroise Thomas.

Early life
Cristóbal Oudrid was born in Badajoz on 7 February 1825. His grandfather was a Flemish military bandmaster and director of the National Militia's band stationed near the Portuguese border. His parents were Carlos Oudrid Estarón (1793–1843) and Antonia Segura González (1801–?).

His father taught him the rudimentary elements of music theory and the basic notions of Solfège, along with his first piano lessons. Despite his manifested precociousness, and even without knowing the most basic rules of harmony, he began arranging some of Haydn and Mozart's musical compositions for flute, clarion, and cornet, once he was already becoming familiar with some wind instruments such as the clarinet, horn, and oboe, which he learned to play on his own. But without a firm understanding of piano method or further training in composition, his technique became flawed, a problem that persisted throughout his career. Oudrid was then brought by his father to the attention of composer Baltasar Saldoni, then director of Teatro del Príncipe. Still very young, he was musical director of the Liceo de Badajoz.

After his father's death on 27 June 1843, Oudrid moved to Madrid the following year with Vicenta Munoz Vallejo, daughter of Jose Muñoz Santano and Pascuala Vallejo; they married in May 1855. His moving to Madrid was with the intention of succeeding as a musician and studying piano with Pedro Albéniz, as a recommendation of his music teacher Baltasar Saldoni, who asked his friends at the weekly magazine Semanario Pintoresco Español to help Oudrid make a living as a piano player at concerts and coffee shops. Another lucky break was a reference letter from Brigadier Juan Guillén Buzarán, director of the orchestra of Teatro Real, by whom he joined the Royal Orchestra as one of its clarinetists. Around this time, he became known as a successful pianist and arranger of operas, including in his musical programme his own compositions, songs and fantasias. His first song collections were published in 1845 and comprised Las Recreos de Artist, Colecion de Consciones y Melodias Espanolas, based on the poetry of Ramon Valladares y Saavedra, and instrumental music for piano such as Variaciones sobre el Hullabaloo de Jerez, Fantasía sobre los temas de "Maria de Rohan", and Hernani.

Career
In 1847, Oudrid began working in the field of stage music as composer, presenting his Andalusian zarzuela La Venta del Puerto o Juanillo El Contrabandista, with lyrics by Mariano Fernandez. It premiered as a major success at Teatro del Príncipe in January of that year, soon placing him among Madrid's most favorite composers. La Pradera del Canal, his second successful work written in collaboration with Luis de Cepeda and Sebastián Iradier followed, premiering at Teatro de la Cruz in March of that year. In 1848, he organized with Rafael Hernando the premiere of El Ensayo de una Ópera, a zarzuela-parody based on the Italian operetta La Prova di una Ópera Seria by Giuseppe Mazza, on the rehearsal of an opera entitled Las Sacerdotisas del Sol o Los Españoles en el Otro Mundo, the success of which marked the beginning of a movement for re-establishment of the modern zarzuela, helping him lead the renewal of the genre. The importance of this work is that it was a major breakthrough in the musical context, leaving local themes behind and widening the expressive and artistic ambition of the Spanish theatrical scenario.

1849 gave rise to other successful works such as Misterios de Bastidores, La Paga de Navidad, and El Alma en Pena, with librettist Francisco de Paula Montemar. A year later, Hernando Rafael Palomar, Francisco Asenjo Barbieri and Joaquín Gaztambide Garbayo collaborated with him on Escenas de Chamberí, which premiered at Teatro Variedades, in Madrid, on 19 November. This work was somehow important for Oudrid in which it led to the founding of the Sociedad Artística Musical on 14 September 1851, together with composers Gaztambide, Hernando, Barbieri, Inzenga, the poet José de Olona and baritone Francisco Salas, with whom the profits would be divided in equal parts. For this purpose, they rent the Teatro del Circo under the assistance of Francisco de las Rivas, an important banker, and pledged to write three works per season, one in two acts and others in three or more. The crowning of this society came on the night of 6 October with the premiere of the three-act zarzuela Jugar con fuego by Francisco Asenjo Barbieri, with text provided by Domingo Ventura de la Vega.

In 1853, the baritone Salas, explained that the works composed by Barbieri and Gaztambide, the former with 17 acts and the latter with 14, had been the most successful in comparison to those of Inzenga, Oudrid and Hernando, with 2, 9 and 3 acts respectively, which had resulted in failure or moderate success. Also, the evidence that Hernando and Inzenga were unfairly profiting from the work of their colleagues, together with the economic pressure from a few singers, forced an apport of extra capital and the restructuring of the society, being that Oudrid, Inzenga and Hernando were then excluded from it for not having sufficient assets to take care of the required capital. This situation cause Oudrid much resentment once he had fulfilled his task with relative success, that is, 9 acts in total. However, Oudrid's musical activity would continue, and years later he would give to the world about fifty zarzuelas more, among which were the El Postillón de la Rioja (1856), based on Adolphe Adam's comic opera Le postillon de Lonjumeau, and El Molinero de Subiza (1870).

In 1860, he was appointed director of the orchestra of Teatro del Circo, where the one-act musical-scherzo El Amor por los Balcones, written in partnership with José Inzenga Castellanos, with text by Ramón de Navarete and Fernández Landa staged with great success. He later became director of Teatro de la Zarzuela, a familiar place where a variety of collaborative zarzuelas premiered such as Frasquito, by Manuel Fernández Caballero, with text by Ricardo de la Vega de Oreiro y Lema, and Juan Lombía's El sitio de Zaragoza en 1808, a staple of the wind band repertoire he composed incidental music for. In November 1867, he was working as choirmaster for the Compañia de Ópera Italiana established at Teatro Real, where he became music director from 1870.

Oudrid's three-act magnum opus, with text by Luis de Eguílaz, El molinero de Subiza, was presented at Teatro de la Zarzuela in 1870, which resulted in his switching over to the podium and the drama genre. His last work was Blancos y azules (1876), in association with Fernández Caballero. The 52-year-old Oudrid died unexpectedly of bacterial pneumonia at Teatro Real, in Madrid, on 13 March 1877, while preparing the performance of the opera Mignon by Ambroise Thomas. His death centennial was suggested to be celebrated with his musical El Molinero de Subiza.

Works
In relation to the musical themes explored by Oudrid, one of his most famous work is La Rondalla Aragonesa, from his symphonic poem El Sitio de Zaragoza, which chronicles the confrontation of Napoleon's troops with the besieged citizens of Zaragoza, premiered at Teatro Principal on 19 November 1856. Another of his merited symphonic works is his Rondeña. In 1850, he wrote the one-act Revue A Última Hora  with verses by José de Olona, and together with Luis y Vicente Arche (1815–1879), the two-act Revue 1866 y 1867 with verses by José María Gutiérrez de Alba, which premiered at Teatro del Circo, in Madrid, on the night of 24 December 1866.

Some of his successful zarzuela-arias are La Pajarita, for soprano and piano, La Macarena, for cello and acoustic guitar composed for the French mezzo-soprano Constance Nantier-Didiée, La Salerosa, written for Antonietta Pozzoni, and Soledad for Rosina Penco. Among his songs of patriotic or military character, those that stand out are La Marcha Triunfal de Africa, El Grito de Patria, and La Polka de Prim, being him also the author of the well-known Salve Marinera, adopted as the anthem of the Spanish Navy from 1870, with lyrics written by Luis de Eguilaz, later adapted by Mariano Méndez Vigo and officially regulated in 1941.

Zarzuelas

Notes

References

External links

 
  Cristóbal Oudrid's music scores Biblioteca Digital del Patrimonio Ibero Americano 
 Cristóbal Oudrid's librettos Hathi Trust Digital Library
 Cristóbal Oudrid's librettos in cooperation with other authors Parnaseo Universitat de València

1825 births
1877 deaths
19th-century pianists
19th-century Spanish composers
19th-century Spanish male musicians
Concert band composers
People from Badajoz
Spanish composers
Spanish male composers
Spanish pianists